Events in the year 1935 in Bolivia.

Incumbents
President: José Luis Tejada Sorzano

Events
January 11 - Paraguayan Army encircle and force the retreat of two Bolivian Army regiments
February 7 - 5,000 Paraguayans attack the heavily fortified Bolivian lines near Villa Montes, with the aim of capturing the oilfields at Nancarainza, but were beaten back by the Bolivian First Cavalry Division.
March 6 - Paraguayan general Jose Felix Estigarribia again focused all his efforts on the Bolivian oilfields, this time at Camiri, 130 km north of Villa Montes. The commander of the Paraguayan 3rd Corps, Gen. Franco, found a gap between the Bolivian 1st and 18th Infantry regiments and ordered his troops to attack through it, but they became stuck in a salient with no hope of further progress. The Bolivian Sixth Cavalry forced the hasty retreat of Franco's troops in order to avoid being cut off
April 15 - Paraguayans punched through the Bolivian lines on the Parapetí River, taking over the city of Charagua. The Bolivian command launched a counter-offensive that forced the Paraguayans back. 
May 27 - founding of Club Aurora
June 4 - a Bolivian regiment was defeated and forced to surrender at Ingavi, in the northern front, after a last attempt at reaching the Paraguay River
June 12 - ceasefire with Paraguay ending the Chaco War

Births

Deaths
July 17 - Daniel Salamanca Urey, former President

 
1930s in Bolivia